There have been two recorded fatal shootings at gay bars in the U.S. state of Virginia which contribute to the history of violence against LGBT people in the United States.

Incidents

Male Box shooting (1977) 

The Male Box (formerly known as "Smitty's") was a gay men's bar and eatery that was located in "The Block" gay community of Richmond, Virginia. In 1977, shots were fired in the Male Box, injuring two patrons and killing one man, Albert Thomas. The incident caused widespread fear among the gay community in Richmond and Virginia and was regarded by members of the local gay community as a homophobic hate crime. The shooting was a result of the business dealings and criminal activities of Leo Joseph Koury (1934–1991), a well-known figure in the Block community who had exploited the gay community for several years. In 1978, a grand jury charged Koury with murder, racketeering, and other offenses that occurred at several gay bars, including the Male Box shooting.

Backstreet Cafe shooting (2000) 
The Backstreet Cafe is a bar in Roanoke, Virginia that largely catered to gay men. On September 22, 2000, Ronald Gay entered the bar and opened fire on the patrons, killing Danny Overstreet, 43 years old, and severely injuring six others. Ronald said he was angry over what his surname had now come to meant. In court, Gay also testified that he had been told by God to find and kill lesbians and gay men, describing himself as a "Christian Soldier working for my Lord." He also testified that "he wished he could have killed more fags." The shooting came one week after members of Roanoke's LGBT community held a gay pride festival. 

After the 2000 shooting at the Backstreet Cafe, LGBT residents and activists gathered to hold vigils, with over 1,000 people walking through the streets of downtown Roanoke to honor the life of Overstreet. The shooting prompted urges to members of Congress to enact federal hate crimes legislation to protect individuals on the basis of sexual orientation. On July 23, 2001, Gay was sentenced to four consecutive life sentences for his crimes. He died in 2022 of natural causes.

See also 

 Gun violence in the United States
 Violence against LGBT people
 History of violence against LGBT people in the United States
 LGBT rights in Virginia

References 

LGBT in Virginia
Attacks on buildings and structures in the United States
Attacks on nightclubs
Deaths by firearm in Virginia
LGBT-related controversies in the United States
Violence against gay men in the United States
LGBT history in the United States